The Roger Williams National Memorial is a landscaped urban park located on a common lot of the original settlement of Providence, Rhode Island, established by minister Roger Williams in 1636. The national memorial commemorates the life of Williams, who co-founded the Colony of Rhode Island and Providence Plantations and championed religious freedom. The park is bounded by North Main, Canal, and Smith Streets, and Park Row.



Description

The Roger Williams National Memorial is a  park located near the eastern bank of the Moshassuck River, east of the Rhode Island State House and north of Downtown Providence. It stands at the base of College Hill, upon which the early settlement of Providence was concentrated. The memorial is separated from the river by Canal Street, and bounded on the other three sides by Smith Street, Park Row, and North Main Street. The southern portion of the park has a relatively open grassy area ringed by trees, while the northern portion is more landscaped, with the visitor center housed in the 1736 Antram-Gray House at the northeast corner, and a parking area on the west side. Major features in the northern section include the Bernon Grove and the site of the spring which prompted Williams to select the site.

The park's visitor center features an exhibit and video about Roger Williams and the founding of Rhode Island, as well as information about historic sites in Providence.

Administrative history
The national memorial was authorized on October 22, 1965. The memorial was listed on the National Register of Historic Places on October 15, 1966. The site was developed in the late 1970s after the land acquisition was completed and the buildings on the land were demolished.  It was the only unit of the National Park System in Rhode Island until 2014 when the Blackstone River Valley National Historical Park was designated.

Gallery

See also
 List of national memorials of the United States
 National Register of Historic Places listings in Providence, Rhode Island
Boston Common

References

Notes

External links

 Official National Park Service website: Roger Williams National Memorial

1965 establishments in Rhode Island
Williams
Geography of Providence, Rhode Island
History museums in Rhode Island
Monuments and memorials on the National Register of Historic Places in Rhode Island
Museums in Providence, Rhode Island
National Memorials of the United States
National Park Service areas in Rhode Island
National Register of Historic Places in Providence, Rhode Island
Protected areas established in 1965
Protected areas of Providence County, Rhode Island
Religion and politics